Datianwan Stadium is a multi-purpose stadium in Chongqing. Built in 1954 under the direction of He Long, Datianwan is the oldest multi-purpose stadium of its size in southwestern China. It is currently used mostly for football matches.  The stadium holds 32,000 people.  It served as the home ground for Chongqing Lifan F.C. before 2004.

Sports venues in Chongqing
Football venues in Chongqing
Multi-purpose stadiums in China
Yuzhong District